"To Mother" is the sixteenth single by Japanese pop singer-songwriter Yui. It was released on June 2, 2010 by Gr8! Records. The single debuted atop the Oricon Weekly Single Chart, becoming her seventh number-one single. It was the first song in which Yui replaced guitar for piano.

Background and writing
Although it is Yui's first song in which she exchanges her guitar for a piano, it was first written using a guitar. When asked about the decision in writing the song, unsurprisingly, was in support of mothers of the world. She also added that although she frequently wrote upbeat songs and melodies on encouraging people, for this song she wanted to look around her own life and see who was important to her. Yui also talked specifically about the lyric, "kindness is so cruel, isn’t it?", inferring that when someone gets hurt, loved ones feel the pain as well. She also talked about the variety of perspective present in the song, through lyrics such as "isn't hatred just a misunderstanding" or "kindness is a thing [that] if snuggled together, a comforting thing".

Music video
The video primarily shows Yui playing a piano, with occasional focuses on her band. This is her first video in which her entire supporting band was non-Japanese. Chris, the drummer, would go on to play with Yui in a variety of live performances such as Rock in Japan Festival or providing drumming tracks to songs, including "I do it" and "Hello (Paradise Kiss)".

Track listing

Normal Edition

Limited Edition
(Normal Edition + DVD)

Oricon sales chart (Japan)

References

Notes

Sources

2010 singles
Oricon Weekly number-one singles
Yui (singer) songs
Songs written by Yui (singer)
2010 songs
Gr8! Records singles